Jordan Howe (born 12 October 1995) is a Paralympian athlete from Wales competing in category T35 sprinting events. Howe qualified for the 2012 Summer Paralympics in the 100 m and 200 m sprint.

History
Howe was born in Cardiff, Wales, in 1995. Howe, who has cerebral palsy, enjoyed sports from a young age, and was a youth swimmer at national level, being a member of the Dragons Disabled Swimming Club, before discovering athletics.

On 23 July 2017 Howe won a 100 m T35 Silver Medal at the World Para Athletics Championships London 2017, running a personal best of 12.52 seconds.

References

External links
 

1995 births
Living people
Sportspeople from Cardiff
Track and field athletes with cerebral palsy
Welsh male sprinters
Sportsmen with disabilities
Paralympic athletes of Great Britain
Athletes (track and field) at the 2012 Summer Paralympics
Welsh Paralympic competitors